Shusett House was a house in Beverly Hills, California, built in 1951 by the American architect John Lautner (19111994).  In 2010, the house is threatened with demolition by its owner. By 2012 it was demolished.

References

Houses in Los Angeles County, California
Demolished buildings and structures in California
Houses completed in 1951
Buildings and structures demolished in 2012